Nithyananda (born Arunachalam Rajasekaran; 1 January 1978), known among followers as Nithyananda Paramashivam or Paramahamsa Nithyananda, is an Indian Hindu guru, godman and cult leader. He is the founder of Nithyananda Dhyanapeetam, a trust that owns temples, gurukulas, and ashrams in many countries.

Following the charges of rape and abduction filed in Indian courts, he fled India and has remained in hiding since 2019. He is subject of a court-issued non-bailable warrant relating to the allegations.

In 2020, he announced the founding of his own self-proclaimed island nation called Kailaasa.

Early life 
Nithyananda was born Arunachalam Rajasekaran in Tiruvannamalai, Tamil Nadu, to father Arunachalam and mother Lokanayaki. He belongs to the Saiva Vellala community.  Sources conflict as to his birth date – a 2003 United States visa gave a date of 13 March 1977, while a sworn affidavit in a 2010 Karnataka High Court case mentioned 1 January 1978.

He was first noticed at the age of three by Yogiraj Yogananda Puri.  He claims to have had powerful spiritual experiences from age 12 and to have experienced full enlightenment at 22.

In 2002 (age 24), he began his public life under the name Nithyananda. He says that this name was given to him by Mahavatar Babaji in a mystical experience during his monastic wandering days in the Himalayas.  In 2003, he started his ashram Dhyanapeetam in Bidadi near Bangalore, Karnataka, India.

Recognition 
Nithyananda was formerly a chairman of Florida-based Hindu University of America. In 2012, Nithyananda was recognized as one of the "100 Most Spiritually Influential Living People" by Watkins' Mind Body Spirit magazine. Also in 2012, Nithyananda was appointed the 293rd pontiff of Madurai Adheenam.

Nithyananda Dhyanapeetam, a religious organisation founded by Nithyananda, hosts cultural events in United States as well as India. They hold two Guinness World Records: one for the largest rope yoga class, and one for the largest pole yoga (mallakhamba) class.

Teachings 
Nithyananda has given discourses on various scriptures like Brahma Sutras, Patanjali’s Yoga Sutras, Shiva Sutras and the Bhagavad Gita.

Claims of paranormal abilities 
Nithyananda has made several pseudoscientific claims, including that he delayed the sunrise for 40 minutes, that he could make cattle speak in Tamil and Sanskrit, and that he could disprove the correctness of the mass-energy equivalence formula E = mc2.

He has claimed to have discovered over 400 , or paranormal abilities, expressible by humans and alleges having initiated his disciples into 60 such powers including  and third-eye awakening. He has since asserted he would open the third eye, for anyone, free of charge by 2021, claiming that the person would be able to see through smog and walls. Disciples of Nithyananda claim that he gave initiations through "third eye" to a class of 82 blind children, thus curing them of blindness. Skeptic Narendra Nayak challenged Nithyananda to prove his claims.

Nithyananda has also claimed that he and his followers were able to perform activities like extrasensory perception, materialisation, body scanning, increasing height, and remote viewing, and that they had the ability to find lost objects.

Controversies 
In 2010, Sun TV telecast video recordings that claimed to show Nithyananda and an actress Ranjitha (who was one of his followers) in a bedroom. The story became viral among news media in Tamil Nadu. Nithyananda and Ranjitha claimed the video to be fabricated and accused Sun TV of extortion. A forensic sciences laboratory in Bengaluru confirmed that the video appeared to be that of Nithyananda and Ranjitha. Sun TV and other media channels since then were subject to various lawsuits. Ranjitha filed a complaint with High Court of Karnataka against news channels. Channels were ordered to apologize to Ranjitha for violating the complainant’s privacy and dignity.

In 2010, a United States citizen who was a disciple of Nithyananda accused him of raping her in the US and in India repeatedly over the course of five years. She filed a complaint with the police department of Ann Arbor, Michigan, who did not commence any formal investigation.  She also filed a complaint with the Karnataka Police in India. On 19 February 2018, the Third Additional District and Sessions Court in Ramanagara ordered the framing of charges against Nithyananda and five others in relation to the case. Criminal revision petitions by the accused were dismissed in the Karnataka High Court on 16 May 2018. An appeal against the High Court decision in the Supreme Court of India, in which all of the accused pleaded not guilty (except for one who was absent from court), was dismissed on 1 June 2018, following which charges were framed in the Ramanagara court on 4 June. In August 2022, the Third Additional District and Sessions Court in Ramanagara issued a non-bailable warrant against Nithyananda following multiple orders to appear in court. 

In 2019, a couple from Tamil Nadu approached the High Court of Gujarat claiming that three of their four children were taken to Nithyananda's ashram in Ahmedabad from Bangalore without their knowledge; the couple sought return of their children to their custody. A first information report (FIR) for alleged abduction was filed by the Gujarat Police in relation to the case on 17 November 2019. In affidavits filed in the Gujarat High Court from various locations in the Americas, two of the missing children, who were by that time adults, rejected their father's claim that they have been detained forcibly. In a joint live video statement, the two girls further claimed that their father had plotted the abduction controversy after his name cropped up in an embezzlement case. 

Nithyananda was the subject of the 2022 Discovery+ series "My Daughter Joined a Cult", streamed internationally.

Flight from India 

On 20 November 2019, the Gujarat Police issued a statement that Nithyananda fled India after choosing not to appear at several court hearings. Some senior police officials did not discount the possibility of him still being in India. He subsequently approached the United Nations complaining about persecution and sought recognition for his new country Kailaasa. Nithyananda also claimed attempts at mob lynching and assassination as reasons he was forced to withdraw himself from Indian society.

The Gujarat Police alleged that he could be shuffling between Ecuador and Trinidad and Tobago, while news reports said that he may have gone to Ecuador because the country does not have an extradition treaty with India. The same month, the Embassy of Ecuador said that it "categorically denies the statement wherever published that Nithyananda was given asylum by Ecuador or has been helped by the Government of Ecuador in purchasing any land or island in South America", but has confirmed Nithyananda had reached Ecuador after he left India, then left soon after his request for international personal protection (refuge) was denied.

Kailaasa island nation 

 
In December 2019, Nithyananda declared that he had created a new "Hindu nation" called Kailaasa (also known as Shrikailasa and Kailasa) and claimed to issue passports, currency, and other documents. In his announcement he said, "Kailaasa is a nation without borders created by dispossessed Hindus around the world who lost the right to practice Hinduism authentically in their own countries". Nithyananda claims that Kailaasa is the world's only sovereign Hindu nation. Kailaasa has also been described as a network of non-governmental organisations spanning three continents.

In August 2020, Nithyananda launched the Reserve Bank of Kailaasa and released its official gold currency, Kailashian dollar. He said the design of the coins was inspired by the currency of "the ancient 56 Hindu nations". He said that the bank would be structured on the lines of the Vatican Bank.  In December 2020, Nithyananda announced that Kailaasa had begun issuing three-day visas for tourists. According to his announcement, visa-holders will have to travel from Australia aboard a newly launched private chartered-flight service, Garuda, and all visitors will be provided with food and accommodation during the course of their stay.

On 19 April 2021, citing COVID-19 cases across the world, Nithyananda banned travel to Kailaasa from India, Brazil, the European Union, and Malaysia. On 7 June 2021, media reported that while answering a disciple during a Amman reading, Nithyananda said that COVID would end when he is received in India with respect and performs pilgrimage to all Shakti Pitha.

In August 2022 a representative for Nithyananda wrote to Sri Lankan President Ranil Wickremesinghe to request political asylum citing Nithyananda's ill-health. The letter contained an offer to invest in Sri Lanka on condition of asylum being granted and the donation of medical equipment required for treatment. The request demanded the establishment of political ties with Kailaasa so that an air ambulance would transport Nithyananda as a head of state.

Publications

Notes

References

External links 

1978 births
Living people
21st-century Hindu religious leaders
Advaitin philosophers
Cult leaders
Cults
Hindu revivalists
Indian Hindu religious leaders
Indian Hindus
Indian spiritual teachers
Indian spiritual writers
People from Tiruvannamalai district